Vác is a district in northern part of Pest County. Vác is also the name of the town where the district seat is found. The district is located in the Central Hungary Statistical Region.

Geography 
Vác District borders with Rétság District and Balassagyarmat District (Nógrád County) to the north, Pásztó District (Nógrád County) and Aszód District to the east, Gödöllő District and Dunakeszi District to the south, Szentendre District and Szob District to the west. The number of the inhabited places in Vác District is 18.

Municipalities 
The district has 2 towns and 16 village.
(ordered by population, as of 1 January 2013)

The bolded municipalities are cities.

Demographics

In 2011, it had a population of 68,234 and the population density was 188/km².

Ethnicity
Besides the Hungarian majority, the main minorities are the Roma (approx. 1,100), Slovak (1,000), German (650) and Romanian (200).

Total population (2011 census): 68,234
Ethnic groups (2011 census): Identified themselves: 62,694 persons:
Hungarians: 58,696 (93.62%)
Gypsies: 1,135 (1.81%)
Slovaks: 989 (1.58%)
Germans: 659 (1.05%)
Others and indefinable: 1,215 (1.94%)
Approx. 5,500 persons in Vác District did not declare their ethnic group at the 2011 census.

Religion
Religious adherence in the county according to 2011 census:

Catholic – 28,657 (Roman Catholic – 28,378; Greek Catholic – 274);
Reformed – 5,286;
Evangelical – 3,426;
other religions – 1,834; 
Non-religious – 8,525; 
Atheism – 964;
Undeclared – 19,542.

Gallery

See also
List of cities and towns in Hungary

References

External links
 Postal codes of the Vác District

Districts in Pest County